Yoo Young-chul (born 18 April 1970) is a South Korean serial killer, sex offender, and self-confessed cannibal. After he admitted to the murders of multiple people, mostly prostitutes and wealthy old women, the Seoul Central District Court convicted him of 20 murders, although one case was dismissed when it was identified as being committed by another serial killer, Jeong Nam-gyu. Yoo burned three and mutilated at least 11 of his victims and admitted that he ate the livers of some of them. He committed his crimes between September 2003 to July 2004 and was apprehended on 15 July 2004. Yoo explained his motives in front of a TV camera saying "Women shouldn't be sluts, and the rich should know what they've done."

Biography
Yoo was married in 1992 and had one son. Yoo was previously convicted 14 times for several different charges, and served a total of seven years in prison prior to his string of murders.

Serial murders
From September to November 2003, Yoo killed several wealthy senior citizens by breaking into their houses and bludgeoning them with a hammer. To cover his tracks, Yoo made the scenes of his crime look like a robbery-homicide took place. However, no money was taken, which confused the police investigators. When the investigation started to intensify, Yoo switched to targeting female masseuses. In January 2004, Yoo was briefly arrested on a minor theft charge, but was released two days later.

Starting in March 2004, Yoo called prostitutes to his residence in western Seoul and bludgeoned them after having sex with them. His victims were dismembered and mutilated to hinder their identification. They were buried in the mountains surrounding the city. Police recovered 11 bodies from the mountain behind Bongwon Temple after Yoo's arrest.

During initial interrogations, Yoo confessed to killing 19 people. On July 18, 2004, he admitted to an additional murder: the killing of a 44-year-old male street vendor. Yoo eventually confessed to killing 26 individuals on July 19, 2004, several days after his arrest, although no details were given. The list of purported victims included several individuals that did not match his prior pattern of wealthy seniors or masseuses. Friends of two of the masseuse victims, whose bodies had been recovered, claimed they were not involved in massage therapy, meaning that Yoo could have other, unreported victims. Although the "Rainy Thursday" murderer was active contemporaneously starting in April 2004, stabbing multiple women late at night in southwest Seoul, police were unable to link Yoo to those murders.

Several days later, Yoo also confessed to killing a young woman (a worker in a clothing store) on 6 February 2004 in Imun-dong after he suspected her of being a prostitute. Yoo had approached her for questioning by pretending to be a police officer. Approximately a month after his arrest, Yoo confessed to eating the flesh of his victims, although no evidence to prove this was available.

Arrest for murder
Yoo was taken into custody on 15 July 2004 and confessed to murdering as many as 19 people initially, specifically targeting affluent senior citizens and masseuses. Yoo had raised suspicions by calling a massage parlor where several employees had recently gone missing after receiving similar phone calls, so the owner of the massage parlor, accompanied by several employees and a single police officer, went to the agreed-upon meeting place. The police officer left before Yoo arrived, and Yoo was apprehended by the employees of the massage parlor. Another police officer placed handcuffs on Yoo after he was detained by the massage parlor employees.

While in custody, Yoo feigned epileptic symptoms and escaped from the police after his restraints were loosened. However, he was re-arrested twelve hours later. Yoo had attempted to escape after being arrested in 2002 for rape by faking an epileptic seizure.

The mother of the Imun-dong murder victim rushed at Yoo with an umbrella when he was brought to the Prosecutor's office later in July, screaming that her daughter would still be alive if the police had captured him earlier. A policeman kicked the mother in the chest to subdue her, claiming that his hands were occupied in holding Yoo.

Motives
Based on the content of his apartment, searched after his arrest, there was some speculation that he patterned his killings after several movies, including Public Enemy, Very Bad Things, and Normal Life. Yoo later confessed to being inspired by serial killer Jeong Du-yeong, who had murdered nine wealthy people in Busan from 1999 to 2000.

On the killing of wealthy older people, prosecutors stated that he killed them out of a hostility that originated from his childhood poverty. Concerning Yoo's killing of women, prosecutors said his resentment stemmed from a lover who betrayed him, and he targeted women with similar jobs as his previous lover in a bid to retaliate. Yoo also told police he killed women because he hated them.

A psychologist who assessed Yoo concluded that he was not mentally ill, but exhibited usual signs associated with anti-social disorder whereby a person creates their own belief system based on distrust of moral and social norms.

Trial and penalty
Police admitted they had little physical evidence linking Yoo to the murders. Yoo first appeared in court on 6 September 2004, refusing to defend himself, declaring his intention to boycott the remainder of the trial, and apologizing to the victims. Yoo boasted that he had no intention of stopping. When he was forced to return two weeks later, he lunged at the three presiding judges and recanted his confession for the February 2004 Imun-dong murder. He refused to appear at the next court session on 4 October 2004  after attempting suicide the night before. Yoo again disrupted a hearing three weeks later when he tried to attack a spectator who had cursed him, which ended with Yoo signing a statement that he would not cause further commotion.

Prosecutors requested the death penalty, which Yoo thanked them for, and Yoo was sentenced to death on 13 December 2004 for 20 counts of murder (the count of murder for the woman in Imun-dong in February 2004 was thrown out). Prosecutors appealed the verdict to secure the 21st count of murder, but the lower court's sentence was upheld on 8 June 2005 by the Supreme Court.

His case, which appalled South Koreans, has fueled the debate on capital punishment in South Korea. Although the death penalty is still permissible under law, it has not been carried out since 1997. It appeared capital punishment might be abolished prior to Yoo's arrest, but support for the death penalty has grown since learning of his crimes.

The Seoul Central District Court said: "Murders of as many as 20 people are unprecedented in the nation and a very serious crime. The death penalty is inevitable for you in light of the enormous pains inflicted on the families concerned and the entire society."

Yoo is currently detained at the Seoul Detention Center.

List of events and his crimes
 1988: Theft
 1991: Theft (sentenced 10 months in prison)
 June 23, 1993: Married his girlfriend
 1993: Theft (sentenced 8 months in prison)
 October 26, 1994: His son was born
 1998: Theft, forgery, identity theft (sentenced 2 years in prison)
 2000: Sexual abuse (rape) (sentenced 3 years 6 months in prison)
 October 27, 2000: Divorced by his wife
 September 11, 2003: Released from prison
 September 24, 2003: Killed first victims 
 December 13, 2004: Sentenced to death
 2023: Currently imprisoned (execution not yet carried out)

Murders
1st, September 24, 2003, Gangnam-gu, Seoul: University professor Lee Deok-su, 72, was stabbed in the neck with a knife. He and his wife, Lee Eun-ok, 67, were then beaten to death with a hammer (4 kg).
2nd, October 9, 2003, Jongno-gu, Seoul: Kang Eun-sun, 85, was bludgeoned to death with a hammer. Her daughter-in-law, Lee Sook-jin, 60, and her handicapped grandson, Go Jin-soo, 35, were killed in the same manner soon afterwards.
3rd, October 16, 2003, Gangnam-gu, Seoul: Yoo Joon-hee, 60, was beaten with a hammer. She was later found by her son at 13:30 but died at 14:00.
4th, November 18, 2003, Jongno-gu, Seoul: Yoo used his hammer to kill Kim Jong-seok, 87, and the latter's housekeeper, Bae Ji-hye, 53. He then accidentally cut himself while attempting to open a safe, so he burned down the house to destroy DNA evidence.
On December 11, 2003, Yoo met a new girlfriend (escort girl), but she inevitably discovered his criminal record and told him not to see her again. He then decided to kill escort girls as revenge.
5th, February 9, 2004, Namdong-gu, Seoul: Chung Young-dae, 47, was killed.
6th, March 16, 2004, Mapo-gu, Seoul: Yoo choked Kwon Jin-hee, 23, to death. He then cut her corpse into pieces and dumped them on a trail near Sogang University.
7th, April 14, 2004, Mapo-gu, Seoul: Ahn Jae-sun, 44, a vendor who had scammed Yoo by giving him fake viagra, was wrestled into his own van, handcuffed, and murdered. Yoo sawed the victim's hands off and disposed of them in a plastic bag. He then set the van on fire.
8th, May 2004, Mapo-gu, Seoul: Yoo lured 25-year-old Kim Hee-sun to his apartment and bludgeoned her unconscious with his hammer. He then decapitated her in his bathroom, smashed her head, mutilated her body, and buried her remains near Bongwon Temple in Seodaemun-gu.
9th, May 7, 2004, Mapo-gu, Seoul: Shin Min-a, 33, was killed in the same procedure as the 8th crime.
10th, June 1, 2004, Mapo-gu, Seoul: Han Sook-ja, 35, was killed in the same procedure as the 8th crime.
11th, June 9, 2004, Mapo-gu, Seoul: Jang Kwang, 26, was killed in the same procedure as the 8th crime.
12th, June 18, 2004, Mapo-gu, Seoul: Kim Ji-ho, 27, was killed in the same procedure as the 8th crime.
13th, June 25, 2004, Mapo-gu, Seoul: Woo Koo-yeon, 28, was killed in the same procedure as the 8th crime.
14th, July 2, 2004, Mapo-gu, Seoul: Kim Mi-young, 26, was killed in the same procedure as the 8th crime.
15th, July 9, 2004 (Aesongi escort), Mapo-gu, Seoul: Go Sun-hee, 24, was killed in the same procedure as the 8th crime.
16th, July 13, 2004 (Aesongi escort), Mapo-gu, Seoul: Im Mi-yeon, 27, was killed in the same procedure as the 8th crime.
At 5am, July 15, 2004, Yoo was captured by police near Grand-mart in Mapo-gu, Seoul.

In film
 The Chaser (2008), a feature film loosely based on Yoo's story.
 The Raincoat Killer: Chasing a Predator in Korea (2021), a Netflix original docuseries that recounts the hunt for Yoo.

Through the Darkness (TV series) (2022),

See also
Kang Ho-sun
List of serial killers by country
List of serial killers by number of victims

References

External links
 Yoo Young-cheol at crimelibrary.com
 
 
 
 

1970 births
Living people
Male serial killers
People convicted of child pornography offenses
People convicted of murder by South Korea
People convicted of theft
Prisoners sentenced to death by South Korea
South Korean cannibals
South Korean people convicted of murder
South Korean prisoners sentenced to death
South Korean serial killers
South Korean rapists
Violence against women in South Korea